Saint-Laurent-du-Var (Occitan: Sant Laurenç de Var, Italian: San Lorenzo del Varo) is a commune in the Alpes-Maritimes department in the Provence-Alpes-Côte d'Azur region on the French Riviera.

History
The town was founded in the 11th century when a hospice was founded under Saint Lawrence's protection. The main activity was to help passengers to cross the Var, which became a border between Kingdom of France and County of Nice in 1481.

Geography
St. Laurent is the second-largest suburb of the city of Nice, after Cagnes-sur-Mer, in the urban community of Nice Côte d'Azur. It lies adjacent to it on the west side on the other side of the river Var.

Nowadays, the town has developed much and its population has been multiplied by ten in the last century and it is now part of Nice metropolitan area.

The suburb's positioning, close to Nice and with an abundance of flatlands - which is a rare resource in this region - led to the building of CAP 3000, the Côte d'Azur's biggest mall, and an industrial zone with many dynamic activities.

The beaches include a yacht club where you can learn how to sail. There are also many water activities including sail boarding and kiting. There is a natural bird and fish conservation area opposite the Holiday Inn.

Along the promenade Flots Bleus and extending to the Port of Saint Laurent there are numerous restaurants and bars which attract many locals and tourists.

Demographics

Transportation
St. Laurent is located close to "Nice Côte d'Azur" Airport, in the eastern side of Var river, Nice. The town also has a harbor, an interchange on the motorway A8, and a railway station (Saint-Laurent-du-Var station) on the Marseille-Toulon-Nice-Ventimiglia line.

Twin towns

Saint-Laurent-du-Var is twinned with:
  Landsberg am Lech (Germany)
  Siófok (Hungary)
  Waldheim (Germany)
  all the French towns named "Saint-Laurent" (95 in Metropolitan France)
  Saint-Laurent-du-Maroni (French Guiana)

See also
 Nice metropolitan area
 Métropole Nice Côte d'Azur
 Communes of the Alpes-Maritimes department

References

External links

 Official website of Saint-Laurent-du-Var
 CAP 3000 website (in French)

Communes of Alpes-Maritimes
Alpes-Maritimes communes articles needing translation from French Wikipedia